Pragyan Ojha (born 5 September 1986) is an Indian former cricketer, who represented India in Test, ODIs and T20. He is an attacking slow left arm orthodox bowler and left-hand tail-ender batsman. He currently plays for Hyderabad in the domestic Ranji Trophy and also has played for Bengal as a guest player in Ranji Trophy for couple of seasons (2015/16-2016/17). He has achieved World no 5 as his career best ranking in ICC Player Rankings. He is the first and one of the two spinners to ever win the Purple Cap in the Indian Premier League. He joined Bihar cricket team as a guest player for 2018/19 season of Ranji Trophy. He is one of the very few players who have taken more wickets than the runs they have scored in Test cricket.

Career
Ojha made his debut in first class cricket in 2004/05 and represented India at the under-19 level as well. He finished the 2006–07 Ranji Trophy season with 29 wickets with an impressive average of 19.89 in just 6 games. The left arm spinner is known for his ability to flight the ball.

His earliest pursuit in cricket was at the age of 10, when he went to Sahid Sporting Club for a summer camp in Bhubaneswar under Sasang S Das, while studying at D.A.V. Public School, Chandrasekharpur. Three years later, he moved to Hyderabad and joined Bhavan's Sri RamaKrishna Vidyalaya in Sainikpuri, Secunderabad and choose cricket as his profession under the guidance of his coach T. Vijay Paul.

Ojha represented Hyderabad Cricket Association in domestic cricket from 2004 till 2015, then played for Cricket Association of Bengal as a guest player for couple of seasons (2015/16-2016/17). He has previously played for Deccan Chargers and Mumbai Indians in the Indian Premier League. His high success in the first couple of seasons in domestic cricket and the IPL ensured his selection in the 15-man Indian squad for the Bangladesh tour and Asia Cup in 2008.

He played his first One Day International match against Bangladesh on 28 June 2008 in Karachi and ended up with figures of 2/43.

On 24 November 2009, Ojha made his Test debut in the Second Test against Sri Lanka in Kanpur, replacing Amit Mishra and gaining figures of 2/37 off 23 overs and 2/36 off of 15.3 overs in India's 100th Test win. He then took five wickets in the Third Test in another innings win for India, taking nine wickets at 28.66 in two Tests. Ojha became the 800th and final Test victim of Muttiah Muralitharan, the highest wicket-taker in Test history.

In his T20 debut against Bangladesh on 6 June 2009, he took 4/21 in four overs. He was awarded Man of the Match for his outstanding and match-winning performance.

He has performed exceedingly well in the six editions of IPL, earning him the praise of his captain Adam Gilchrist and Sachin Tendulkar. He was all the more successful in the second season, which ensured his selection in the 2009 ICC World Twenty20 in England. IPL 3 he was awarded the Purple Cap for picking up the most wickets in the tournament. He has been part of 3 IPL winning teams (1 for Deccan Chargers & 2 for Mumbai Indians) & 1 champions League for Mumbai Indians.

In August, 2011 he signed to play for Surrey for the final few weeks of the 2011 season.[2] His 24 wickets in 4 games helped Surrey to promotion to Division One of the LV County Championship.

In November, during the First Test of the West Indies Tour of India he staged a marvelous comeback taking 6 wickets for 72 runs in the first innings.

In December, 2014 Ojha was barred from bowling in competitive cricket after his action was found to be illegal. Later on 30 January 2015 Ojha cleared the test and was allowed to resume his bowling.

In a 2008 interview, Ojha said that Venkatapathy Raju, who was also a left-arm spinner, inspired him to play for India.

Ahead of the 2018–19 Ranji Trophy, he transferred from Hyderabad to Bihar.

On 21 February 2020, he has announced his retirement from all forms of cricket. He played 48 international matches - 24 Tests, 18 ODIs and 6 T20Is - from 2008 to 2013. In his last game for India, a Test against West Indies in 2013, which was Sachin Tendulkar's farewell match, he finished with match figures of 10 for 89 and was named the Man of the Match.

Personal life 
Pragyan was born in Bhubaneswar, Odisha. He moved to Hyderabad at the age of 13 and since then he has been residing there with his family. His parents are Maheswar Ojha (retired State Govt. Officer) and Bidulata Ojha (M.A in literature). On 16 May 2010 he married Karabee Baral, daughter of Kailash Chandra Baral and Chanchala Naik both professors at English and Foreign Languages University.

Awards
Ojha was awarded man of the match in his debut T20 game versus Bangladesh in 2009 ICC World Twenty20 for a figure of 4/21.  on 6 June 2009
Ojha was awarded Man of the Match for his outstanding figures of 5/40 and 5/49, against West Indies which was Sachin's last and 200th test match, 14-16 Nov 2013.
Ojha was awarded IPL Jury's Best Bowler at the Grand Hyatt Hotel, Mumbai on 23 April 2010.
Odisha's Chief Minister Naveen Patnaik presented a memento to Ojha for his completion of 100 Test Wickets on 4 August 2013.

References

External links
 
 Pragyan Ojha's profile page on Wisden

1986 births
Living people
Sportspeople from Bhubaneswar
Cricketers from Odisha
Indian cricketers
India Test cricketers
India One Day International cricketers
India Twenty20 International cricketers
Hyderabad cricketers
Deccan Chargers cricketers
Mumbai Indians cricketers
South Zone cricketers
Surrey cricketers
India Red cricketers
India Green cricketers
India Blue cricketers
Dayanand Anglo-Vedic Schools System alumni
Bengal cricketers
Bihar cricketers